Hare Brush is a 1955 Warner Bros. Merrie Melodies animated short directed by Friz Freleng. The short was released on May 7, 1955, and stars Bugs Bunny and Elmer Fudd.

Hare Brush pokes fun at Freudian psychoanalysis, psychiatric medication, hypnosis, and the cliches of other Bugs Bunny shorts. Along with What's Opera, Doc? and Rabbit Rampage, it is one of the few cartoons where Elmer gets the upper hand on Bugs. It is also the first short in the Merrie Melodies series to open with Milt Franklyn's re-arranged version of "Merrily We Roll Along"; the new fanfare would stay in use until 1964.

Plot
In the boardroom of the Elmer J. Fudd Corporation, the board of directors meets to discuss a serious threat to the company's future. The CEO, Elmer Fudd, is suffering from a mental illness and believes himself to be a rabbit. The board unanimously agrees to commit Elmer to "Fruitcake Sanitarium" ("It's Full of Nuts").  Elmer, now wearing a rabbit suit, sees Bugs Bunny walking past and lures him to the window with a carrot. Bugs goes inside while Elmer hops out the window, gaining his freedom. Bugs lies in Elmer's bed to keep it warm for him.

Viennese psychiatrist Dr. Oro Myicin arrives to begin treating Elmer's delusion and is stunned to see Bugs instead. He declares Bugs as the worst case of "rabbitschenia" he has ever seen. Dr. Myicin tells Bugs that he is not Elmer J. Fudd, Bugs is Elmer J. Fudd. Thinking that Myicin is a "screwball," Bugs then attempts to psychoanalyze the doctor instead. Irked, Myicin gives Bugs a pill, which makes him very vulnerable to suggestion. Once it takes effect, the doctor forces Bugs to repeat again and again, "I am Elmer J. Fudd, millionaire. I own a mansion and a yacht."

Dr. Myicin releases Bugs (now sporting morning dress and a Derby hat) from the sanitarium as "cured" of the belief that he is a rabbit and convinced that he is Elmer Fudd. Upon picking him up, Elmer's chauffeur tells Bugs that since it is Wednesday, he has packed his hunting clothes and shotgun. Bugs decides to relax by hunting.

Dressed in Elmer's hunting clothes, Bugs follows "wabbit twacks" to a rabbit hole. Chomping a carrot, Elmer pops out. Bugs aims the shotgun and prepares to shoot Elmer, who causes the weapon to backfire by plugging the barrel with his finger. After a short chase through a stream, which includes Bugs taking an underwater shot, Elmer bounds into a cave. Bugs props the gun against a tree, leans into the cave and declares, "Come out, wabbit, or I'll bwast you out!" Meanwhile, Elmer has exited the cave through an adjacent opening, tossed the shotgun aside and taken its place against the tree. Bugs grabs Elmer, points him into the cave and Elmer says, "Bang, bang!" Bugs is fooled, and ventures into the cave to see. In the pitch dark, Bugs strikes a match to reveal a huge bear standing beside him. As  Bugs flees with the bear chasing him, Elmer calls out the suggestion that Bugs plays dead. He does so and the bear buries him under a cliff ledge. Bugs then falls out of the underside into a stream far below.

Returning to his rabbit hole, Elmer is shocked to find Bugs waiting for him. Aiming his shotgun in Elmer's face, Bugs yells, "No wabbit's gonna outsmart Elmer J. Fudd!"  Before he can fire, an IRS agent taps Bugs on the shoulder and asks, "Pardon me, did you say you were Elmer J. Fudd?" Bugs replies, "Yes. I am Elmer J. Fudd, miwwionaire. I own a mansion and a yacht." Bugs is then arrested, for non-payment of $300,000 in back taxes. As the tax collector hauls Bugs away, Elmer turns to the camera and says "I may be a scwewy wabbit, but I'm not going to Alcatwaz!" indicating that Elmer knew he was about to get arrested so he planned the whole thing and became a rabbit, then dances the Bunny Hop and hops away.

Music 
Milt Franklyn's music is characteristically less through-composed than that of Carl Stalling, and consists largely of rising and falling arpeggios, stings, and short motifs. Nevertheless, it also follows the usual pattern of Warner's shorts in quoting snippets of popular music to reflect the development of the plot. Starting as usual with "Merrily We Roll Along," the cartoon sets the scene for the corporate meeting by quoting "42nd Street." To introduce the sanitarium, Franklyn uses the old rhyme "Nuts in May." The hypnotic phrase "I am Elmer J. Fudd," etc., is associated with a driving motif in the bass. "A-Hunting We Will Go" marks the chauffeur's announcement that it is Wednesday, the day on which Fudd customarily goes hunting, and the start of the hunt itself. As noticed above, the final scene of the action ends with Ray Anthony's Bunny Hop, and the short concludes, as usual, with "Merrily We Roll Along" over the "That's All, Folks!" caption.

Home Media
Hare Brush was included on several Looney Tunes VHS cassette releases, as well as the Bugs Bunny 80th Anniversary Collection Blu-ray.

References

External links

 

1955 films
1955 short films
1955 comedy films
1955 animated films
1950s Warner Bros. animated short films
Merrie Melodies short films
Bugs Bunny films
Elmer Fudd films
Films about hypnosis
Short films directed by Friz Freleng
Films scored by Milt Franklyn
Warner Bros. Cartoons animated short films
1950s English-language films